The 2022 Tampa Bay Rowdies season is the club's thirteenth season of existence, their sixth in the United Soccer League, and fourth in the USL Championship. Including the previous Tampa Bay Rowdies, this is the 29th season of a franchise in the Tampa Bay metro area with the Rowdies moniker. Including the now-defunct Tampa Bay Mutiny, this is the 35th season of professional soccer in the Tampa Bay region.

Club

Roster

Team management and staff

Competitions

Exhibitions 
The Rowdies initial preseason schedule was announced on February 11, 2022. All matches were closed to the public.

USL Championship

Standings — Atlantic Division

Results summary

Results by round

Results

USL Championship playoffs

Bracket

Results

U.S. Open Cup

References 

Tampa Bay Rowdies
Tampa Bay Rowdies (2010–) seasons
Tampa Bay Rowdies
Tampa Bay Rowdies
Sports in St. Petersburg, Florida